Christ Church Cathedral is an Anglican Gothic Revival cathedral in Montreal, Quebec, Canada, the seat of the Anglican Diocese of Montreal. It is located at 635 Saint Catherine Street West, between Avenue Union and Boulevard Robert-Bourassa. It is situated on top of the Promenades Cathédrale underground shopping mall, and south of Tour KPMG. It was classified as historical monument by the government of Quebec on May 12, 1988. In 1999, it was designated a National Historic Site of Canada.

History 

An Anglican ministry first began in Montreal in 1760. Services were held in chapels of the Roman Catholic Church for the first half-century. In 1789, the Anglican congregation of Montreal received a former Jesuit church, renaming it as Christ Church. The building was used by the congregation until 1803, when it was destroyed in a fire. The clergyman was appointed by Dorchester as garrison chaplain of Montreal in 1766, with inaugural service in Christ Church was pronounced by him on 20 December 1789. The first Christ Church was in fact the repaired and re-dedicated Jesuit church. So it was the second church building that was constructed in 1814.

In 1850, the second Christ Church was designated as the cathedral for the new Anglican Diocese of Montreal upon its separation from the Anglican Diocese of Quebec. The cathedral was destroyed by fire in 1856.

The present cathedral, a neo-Gothic structure, was designed by architect Frank Wills (1822–1856), who also designed Christ Church Cathedral in Fredericton, New Brunswick. Before construction began, Willis died, and Montreal architect Thomas Seaton Scott (1826–1895) was commissioned to carry out his design. The structure was completed in 1859 and consecrated in 1867.

Andrew Taylor oversaw alterations and other restoration of the cathedral from 1890 to 1891 and installed a memorial window for Mrs. A.C. Hooper in 1902–03.

Modeled after the 14th century Gothic-style churches of the English countryside, the cathedral features a square  crossing tower.

Unfortunately, the design, though acclaimed for its architecture, suffered from important engineering flaws. The soft ground could not support the heavy central stone tower and steeple, which began to subside and lean.  This defect formed the basis of an important lawsuit concerning builder's liability, which went all the way to the Judicial Committee of the Privy Council, at that time the highest court in the British Empire.  The Judicial Committee upheld the decisions of the Quebec courts, which had held that the builder was liable for having built the steeple on ground that could not support its weight: Wardle v. Bethune The case was often cited as precedent relating to article 1688 of Quebec's original Civil Code.

By 1920, the tower leaned  to the south. George Allan Ross designed alterations in 1923 and reconstructed the tower from 1939 to 1940. In 1927, the stone steeple, weighing  was removed. New foundations were poured in 1939, and in 1940, an anonymous donation permitted the construction of a much lighter steeple made of aluminum, molded to simulate the former stone spire.

Recent additions to the church include a choir gallery, built in 1980, and the church's third organ, installed in 1981. Notable musicians to have served as the church's organist include Alfred Whitehead (1922–1947), S. Drummond Wolff (1952–1956) and Patrick Wedd ( 1996–2018).

The organ is opus 77 of Karl Wilhelm, Inc. of Mont-Saint-Hilaire, Quebec.  It is a mechanical key and stop instrument with four-manuals, 42 stops and 63 ranks.  In 1992, the pedal division was expanded with a 32' Bombarde.

The organ replaced the earlier instrument that served the congregation from 1859.  The earlier instrument was constructed by William Hill and Son in London to duplicate an organ given to the congregation by King George III and destroyed in the fire of 1856.  The Hill instrument was remodeled and enlarged several on at least five occasions during the tenure of its service.  In 1979, the congregation commissioned the mechanical organ and the earlier instrument was sold for parts.

Promenades Cathédrale

In the 1980s, a vast real estate project was undertaken below the cathedral. The project consisted of a 34-floor skyscraper, Tour KPMG, built north of the cathedral, underground parking, and two levels of retail stores situated beneath the cathedral. For a period in 1987, the cathedral was supported on stilts while footings for the underground mall, Promenades Cathédrale, were excavated. This project allowed for the linkage of the eastern and western branches of Montreal's underground city, connecting the Eaton's store (subsequently Complexe Les Ailes) and The Bay's Henry Morgan Building.

Canadian Grenadier Guards
Christ Church Cathedral is the regimental church of the Canadian Grenadier Guards. The guards maintain their traditional ties with the church, as well as to McGill University, by marching from the Arts Building on campus, to the cathedral, annually in commemoration of Remembrance Day. The cathedral also houses the guards' retired regimental colours.

L'Oasis musicale
Every Saturday at 4pm throughout the year the cathedral hosts a series of free weekly concerts, "L'Oasis musicale," which supports and promotes young aspiring musicians, many of whom are studying at music colleges in Montreal and starting out on their career. The concerts are open to all. The concerts feature a range of musicians, from solo instrumentalists and singers to ensembles, small orchestras, and choirs. The repertoire is mainly classical music, but occasionally, popular, folk, religious, or traditional music is played.

See also 

 List of cathedrals in Canada
 Dean of Montreal

References

Further reading
  Commission des biens culturels, Les chemins de la mémoire, Monuments et sites historiques du Québec, Vol. II, Les Publications du Québec, Québec, 1991, pp. 81–83.

External links 

 Christ Church Cathedral (Montreal) - Official Website
 Christ Church Cathedral (Montreal) on Facebook
 Christ Church Cathedral - (Montreal) on Twitter
 Diocese of Montreal
 Archiseek description

Churches completed in 1859
19th-century Anglican church buildings in Canada
Anglican cathedrals in Quebec
Cathedrals in Montreal
Gothic Revival architecture in Montreal
Landmarks in Montreal
Heritage buildings of Quebec
National Historic Sites in Quebec
Anglican church buildings in Montreal
Churches on the National Historic Sites of Canada register
Burned buildings and structures in Canada
Rebuilt churches in Canada
Downtown Montreal
Gothic Revival church buildings in Canada